Edgar Ross may refer to:

Edgar Ross (boxer) (1949–2012), American boxer
Edgar Ross (communist) (1904–2001), Australian communist